Circumstantial speech, also referred to as circumstantiality, is the result of a so-called "non-linear thought pattern" and occurs when the focus of a conversation drifts, but often comes back to the point. In circumstantiality, apparently unnecessary details and seemingly irrelevant remarks cause a delay in getting to the point.

If someone exhibits circumstantial speech during a conversation, they will often seem to "talk the long way around" to their point, which may be an attempt by the speaker to include pertinent details, that may contrast with the speech which is more direct, succinct, and to the point (the gist) even at the expense of more precise, accurate communication.
Circumstantial speech is more direct than tangential speech in which the speaker wanders and drifts and usually never returns to the original topic, and is far less severe than logorrhea.

Signs and symptoms
A person with circumstantiality has slowed thinking and invariably talks at length about irrelevant and trivial details (i.e., circumstances). Eliciting information from such a person can be difficult since circumstantiality makes it hard for the individual to stay on topic. In most instances however, the relevant details are eventually achieved.

Example
An example of circumstantial speech is that when asked about the age of a person's mother at death, the speaker responds by talking at length about accidents and how too many people die in accidents, then eventually says what the mother's age was at death.

Treatment
Treatment often involves the use of behavioral modification and anticonvulsants, antidepressants and anxiolytics.

See also
Aphasia
Agnosia
Auditory processing disorder

References

Communication disorders
Obsessive–compulsive disorder
Thought disorders